The Kh-47M2 Kinzhal (in Russian: Х-47М2 Кинжал, "Dagger", NATO reporting name Killjoy) is a Russian nuclear-capable hypersonic air-launched ballistic missile. It can carry either conventional or nuclear warheads and can be launched by Tu-22M3 bombers or MiG-31K interceptors. It has been deployed at airbases in Russia's Southern Military District and Western Military District.

The Kinzhal entered service in December 2017 and was one of the six new Russian strategic weapons unveiled by Russian President Vladimir Putin on 1 March 2018.

Design
The missile is designed to hit NATO warships posing a threat to strategic missile systems in European Russia and to destroy NATO missile defense systems, ballistic missile defense ships and land objects close to the Russian borders. It is allegedly designed to overcome any known or planned NATO air or missile defense systems including the MIM-104 Patriot, Terminal High Altitude Area Defense and Aegis Combat System. Rather than using the more recent hypersonic glide and scramjet missile designs, it uses standard ballistic missile technology at greater speeds.

The overall design of the missile is shared with the 9K720 Iskander, with the guidance section modified for Kinzhal. It can reportedly hit both static targets and mobile ones such as aircraft carriers.

The high speed of the Kinzhal gives it better target penetration than lighter, slower cruise missiles. With advanced maneuvering capabilities, high precision and hypersonic speed, some sources give it the name "carrier killer" due to its alleged ability to disable and possibly even sink a 100,000 ton supercarrier with a single strike.

Russian media state the missile's range as  when carried by the MiG-31K and  when carried by the Tu-22M3 when the aircraft's combat radius is added to the missile's range.

Operational history
The Kinzhal entered service in December 2017 and was one of the six new Russian strategic weapons unveiled by Russian President Vladimir Putin on 1 March 2018.

In May 2018, ten MiG-31Ks capable of using Kinzhal missiles were on experimental combat duty and ready to be deployed. By December 2018, aircraft armed with Kinzhal missiles had conducted 89 sorties over the Black Sea and the Caspian Sea.

By February 2019, crews of the MiG-31K Kinzhal missile carriers had performed more than 380 training sorties with the missile, of which at least 70 have used air-to-air refueling. The weapon made its public debut during the Aviadarts international contest in August 2019.

According to TASS, the first launch of Kinzhal in the Arctic took place mid-November, 2019. The launch was reportedly carried out by a MiG-31K from Olenya air base. The missile hit a ground target at "Pemboy" proving ground, reaching a speed of Mach 10. In June 2021, a Kinzhal missile was launched by a MiG-31K from Khmeimim Air Base on a ground target in Syria. A separate aviation regiment was formed in 2021 which is armed with MiG-31K aircraft with the Kinzhal hypersonic missile.

Rumours in early February 2022 suggested that several  MiG-31  interceptors armed with Kinzhal missiles were dispatched from Soltsy Air Base, Novgorod Oblast, to Chernyakhovsk Naval Air Base in Russia's western Kaliningrad exclave. Russia's Aerospace Force launched Kinzhal missiles on 19 February 2022.

During the 2022 Russian invasion of Ukraine, the Russian military said that it used Kinzhal missiles to destroy an alleged underground weapons depot of the Ukrainian armed forces in Deliatyn on 18 March 2022 and a fuel depot in Konstantinovka the next day. U.S President Joe Biden said of its use "As you all know, it's a consequential weapon but with the same warhead on it as any other launched missile. It doesn't make that much difference except it's almost impossible to stop it."

It was reportedly used again on 11 April. On 9 May, according to reports, Russian Tu-22 aircraft launched three Kinzhal-type missiles at targets in the port city of Odesa.

Three MiG-31K fighter aircraft with Kinzhal hypersonic missiles redeployed to the Chkalovsk airfield in the Kaliningrad Region on 18 August 2022.

According to unconfirmed reports, a Russian MiG-31 thought to be carrying a Kinzhal missile crashed on take-off from an air base in Belbek, Crimea on 1 October 2022. The navigator managed to eject, but the pilot was killed.

On 26 January 2023, according to the Ukrainian Air Force, 55 missiles and 24 Shahed-136 drones were fired at targets in Ukraine. The Ukrainian Air Force said that they had shot down all of the drones and 47 of the missiles. Included in the attack was a Kh-47 Kinzhal hypersonic missile. Kyiv's Mayor said one person had died and two were wounded when an apartment block was hit in the Holosiiv district.

On 9 March 2023 a barrage of 84 missiles, including six Kinzhals, was fired at Ukrainian cities, their largest use to date. Ukraine has no way to stop Kinzhals. It is not known whether the Patriot missile system can stop such missiles.

Operators
 
 Russian Aerospace Forces

See also
AGM-183 ARRW
Avangard (hypersonic glide vehicle)
3M22 Zircon
Kh-22

References

External links 

Kh-47M2 Kinzhal

Post–Cold War weapons of Russia
Kinzhal
Air-launched ballistic missiles
Kinzhal
Kinzhal
Hypersonic aircraft
Military equipment introduced in the 2010s